Ahmed Saadawi (born 1973) is an Iraqi novelist, poet, screenwriter and documentary film maker. He won the 2014 International Prize for Arabic Fiction for Frankenstein in Baghdad. He lives and works in Baghdad.

Awards and honours
2010 Beirut39 project, one of 39 chosen participants
2014 International Prize for Arabic Fiction, winner for Frankenstein in Baghdad
2017 Grand prix de l'Imaginaire, Foreign-language novel winner for Frankenstein in Baghdad

Bibliography
2000 Anniversary of Bad Songs (poetry)
2004 The Beautiful Country (novel)
2008 Indeed He Dreams or Plays or Dies (novel)
2013 Frankenstein in Baghdad (novel)

References

20th-century Iraqi novelists
Living people
1973 births
International Prize for Arabic Fiction winners
21st-century Iraqi novelists